The American Motors Corporation (AMC) straight-6 family of engines was used in AMC passenger cars and Jeep vehicles from 1964 through 2006.

195.6
Sometimes referred to as the 196 engine, it was produced from 1952 through 1965 in both overhead valve (OHV) and flathead (L-head) side-valve versions.

The 196 was originally designed to be an economy engine by Nash Motors, the company that merged with Hudson to form AMC in 1954. This engine was introduced in the 1941 Nash Ambassador 600 model. The intake and exhaust manifolds were integrated into the cylinder block casting to reduce both weight and cost. It had four main bearings, unlike the 7-main-bearing 234 flathead engine it replaced.

This engine was redesigned as an OHV for the 1956 model year. The flathead version was discontinued during 1956 and 1957, but reemerged in 1958 as the economy engine for the "new" Rambler American and was available through 1965. The new OHV configuration for 1956 continued with the water pump mounted the left side of the engine (driven by a shaft extending from the back of the generator). This was changed for 1957 with the water pump mounted on the front of the engine above the timing chain. When the flathead model was reintroduced it also received a new water pump. Featuring high-quality parts as forged crankshafts and connecting rods, these engines earned a reputation for durability. The flathead, however, was prone to the typical flathead problem of overheating under sustained heavy load. This was from the hot exhaust traveling through the cylinder block to the exhaust manifold.

American Motors introduced a die-cast aluminum block version of the OHV  engine in 1961. It was produced through 1964. This engine used cast-iron cylinder liners and a cast-iron head. The cylinder heads for the two types of block (aluminum and cast iron) are of similar design, but are not interchangeable. The cylinder head for the aluminum block is roughly 1/8" wider than that for the cast-iron block and uses a slightly different head bolt pattern.

The 196 OHV requires more periodic maintenance than newer-model engines. The head bolts must be re-torqued (retightening process) regularly. Factory service manuals recommend that head bolt torque be checked every  and to re-torque them every . With modern head gaskets this service interval can be extended to re-torque the bolts every , or every other year. The cause of the headbolts loosening over time is believed to be thermal expansion and contraction of the head due to the rather heavy design. This maintenance is also imperative to prevent the engine from overheating (the first sign of a blown head gasket) and warping or cracking the head. The cast-iron liners in the aluminum block version can also shift if the head bolts are not properly torqued and the engine is allowed to overheat. Good replacement heads and aluminum blocks for these engines are now difficult to find.

The modern era I-6

The company designed an entirely new six-cylinder with a short stroke and seven main bearing crankshaft for 1964. This design was produced in various forms through 2006. The  inline six was AMC's first modern six-cylinder engine.

To commemorate the engine's May 1964 introduction, a total of 2,520 "Typhoon" versions were made based on the Rambler Classic hardtop body. Each featured the  8.5:1 compression ratio engine, Solar Yellow body paint, a Classic Black roof, and a distinctive "Typhoon" script in place of the usual "Classic" name. All other AMC options (except engine options) were available.

The new engine replaced the Nash  OHV I6 in the Classic and Ambassador for the 1965 model year (this was also the first use of a six in the Ambassador since 1956).

In 1966, a  version finally replaced the aging  OHV and L-head engines. Road tests by Consumer Reports described the new powerplant as "a very smooth and quiet engine, which should give good performance."

Increasingly stringent emission control regulations continued to decrease the engine's power output, making the smaller version inadequate as increasingly stringent safety regulations also made vehicles heavier.

199
The  199 was produced from 1965 to 1970.

Applications:
Rambler Classic (1965–66, fleet cars only)
Rambler American/AMC Rambler (1965–69)
AMC Hornet (1970)
AMC Gremlin (1970)
VAM Rambler American (mid 1965–1969) U.S. equivalent - AMC Rambler American and AMC Rambler sedans.
VAM Camioneta Rambler American (mid 1965–1967) U.S. equivalent - AMC Rambler American wagon.

232

The  232 was produced from 1964 to 1979. The 232 was the base six-cylinder engine on many models through 1979, and even towards the end of its usage was considered reasonably modern in design.

After its midyear 1964 introduction in the "Typhoon" two-door hardtop as part of the mid-sized Rambler Classic line, the 232 engine was adapted to fit into the smaller 1965 Rambler American by using a special short water pump, an adaptive piece also used in the 1971–1975 Jeep CJ-5. Air conditioning was available only with the older 196 engine in the American, because there wasn't space for it with the longer 232.

Through the 1970 model year, the 232 shared a deck height with the  engines. Starting in 1971, AMC raised the deck height to produce the 258, and the 232 adopted the 199's longer connecting rods and shared deck height with the 258. Bore and stroke remained the same.

In 1972, the bell housing bolt pattern changed to match the larger version used on the V8 engines.

Changes for the 1976 model year included fuel economy improvements that also reduced emissions and reduced warmup time.

Rambler Classic (1964–1966)
Rambler American/AMC Rambler (1964–1969)
Rambler/AMC Marlin (1965–1967)
Rambler/AMC Ambassador (1965–1970)
Rambler/AMC Rebel (1967–70)
AMC Javelin (1968–74)
AMC Hornet (1970–77)
AMC Gremlin (1970–78)
AMC Matador (1971–74)
AMC Pacer (1975–79)
AMC Concord (1978–79)
AMC Spirit (1979)
Jeep CJ (1972–79)
Jeep Cherokee (1974–79)
Jeep Wagoneer (1965–1971)
Jeep J-Series (1965–1970)
Jeep Commando (1972–1973) (1976 in Spain)
International Harvester Scout (1969–1971)
International Harvester Light Line pickups/Travelall (1968–71)
VAM Rambler American Hardtop (1965) U.S. equivalent AMC Rambler American 440H hardtop
VAM Rambler American Rally (1969–1971) U.S. equivalent 1969 AMC Rambler Rogue sedan instead of hardtop and 1970–1971 Hornet X
VAM Rambler American (1968–1972) U.S. equivalent AMC Rambler American sedans and AMC Hornet sedans 
VAM Camioneta Rambler American (1968–1972) U.S. equivalent AMC Rambler American wagon and AMC Hornet Sportabout
VAM Rambler Classic 660 (1965) U.S. equivalent AMC Rambler Classic
VAM Rambler Classic 770 (1966–1969) U.S. equivalent 1966 AMC Rambler Classic sedans plus AMC Rebel four door sedan
VAM Rambler Classic SST (1967–1969) U.S. equivalent AMC Rebel hardtop
VAM Javelin (1968–1969) U.S. equivalent AMC Javelin
VAM Gremlin (1974–1976) U.S. equivalent AMC Gremlin

252
The  engine was produced by AMC's Mexican subsidiary Vehiculos Automotores Mexicanos (VAM) beginning in 1969 and was dropped after 1972, replaced with AMC's 258 for the 1973 model year onward. It was produced in VAM's Lerma, Estado de México engine plant.

Output for 1972 Rambler American Rally model (gross):
Horsepower  at 4600 rpm
Torque  at 2300 rpm

Engine dimensions:
Compression ratio 9.5:1
Intake valve diameter 
Exhaust valve diameter 
Connecting Rod length 
Deck height 
Bore 
Stroke 

Applications:
VAM Javelin (1969–1970) U.S. equivalent - AMC Javelin
VAM Rambler Classic SST (1969–1971) U.S. equivalent - AMC Rebel hardtop and AMC Matador hardtop
VAM Rambler Classic 770 (1970) U.S. equivalent - AMC Rebel sedan
VAM Rambler Classic DPL (1971) U.S. equivalent - AMC Matador sedan
VAM Rambler American Rally (1972) U.S. equivalent - AMC Hornet Rallye X

258

The  was produced from 1971 to 1990. It featured an undersquare  bore and  stroke; it was otherwise similar to the 199 and 232. This engine is considered reliable, inexpensive, and torquey. Later 258 models (starting with the 1980 model year for California AMC Concords and Spirits, 1981 for California Jeeps, California Eagles, and 49-state Concord and Spirits, as well as in 1982 for 49-state Eagles and all other applications) are equipped with AMC Computerized Engine Control (CEC) system. This engine also found some use in farm/industrial applications such as the International Harvester 4000 swather. It had a crankshaft more balanced, with counterweights than the following Jeep HO engines, allowing for extracting more power by transforming engine.

AMC Hornet/Concord/Eagle (1971–1988)
AMC Pacer (1975–1980)
AMC Matador (1971–1978)
AMC Gremlin and Spirit (1971–1983)
International Harvester Scout and Light Line trucks (1972–1980)
Jeep CJ (1972–1986)
Jeep Cherokee and Wagoneer (1972–1986)
Jeep J-Series (1971–1988)
Jeep Wrangler (1987–1990)
Jeep Commando (1972–1973)
VAM Rambler American (1973–1974) U.S. equivalent - AMC Hornet sedans
VAM Rambler American Rally (1973–1974) U.S. equivalent - AMC Hornet X sedan instead of hatchback. 
VAM Camioneta Rambler American (1973–1974) U.S. equivalent - AMC Hornet Sportabout
VAM American (1975–1983) U.S. equivalent - AMC Hornet sedan base model and AMC Concord sedan base model. 
VAM American Rally (1975) U.S. equivalent - AMC Hornet X sedan instead of hatchback. 
VAM Camioneta American (1975–1983) U.S. equivalent - AMC Hornet Sportabout and Concord base model wagon. 
VAM American ECD (1975–1979) U.S. equivalent - AMC Hornet DL two and four door sedans and AMC Concord DL/Limited four door sedan.
VAM Gremlin X (1976–1982) U.S. equivalent - AMC Gremlin X and AMC Spirit sedan X model equivalent. 
VAM Gremlin (1977–1983) U.S. equivalent - AMC Gremlin and AMC Spirit sedan base model.

282
The  engine was produced by AMC's Mexican subsidiary Vehiculos Automotores Mexicanos (VAM) beginning in 1971 through 1986. This was similar to a 258 in stroke, cast with a larger  bore,  larger than the 258, giving . All VAM 282s from 1971 through 1978 were still advertised with an output measured using the gross rating system that was last used under AMC in 1971. The 1979–1983 units were measured under the new net rating system. All units were produced in VAM's engine plant located in Lerma, Estado de México.

The 282 which had a larger bore is considered the ancestor of the 4.0 stroker engine where it is common for the engine rebuilder to use an AMC 258 crankshaft in a Jeep 4.0 cylinder block – a 4.5 uses the stock AMC 258 connecting rods (with stock or .020 overbore using aftermarket pistons) while the 4.6, 4.7, and 5.0 strokers use the 258 crank but retaining the 4.0 connecting rods.

Output for 1971-73 models (gross):
Horsepower  at 4400 rpm
Torque  at 2200 rpm
Compression ratio 9.5:1

Output for 1974 models (gross):
Horsepower  at 4400 rpm
Torque  at 2200 rpm
Compression ratio 8.5:1

Output for 1975-76 models (gross):
Horsepower  at 4400 rpm
Torque  at 2200 rpm
Compression ratio 7.7:1

Output for 1977-78 models (gross):
Horsepower  at 4400 rpm
Torque  at 2200 rpm
Compression ratio 8.0:1

Output for 1979-81 Standard models (net):
Horsepower  at 3800 rpm
Torque  at 2200 rpm
Compression ratio 8.0:1

Output for 1979 American 06/S and 1980-81 Rally GT models (net):
Horsepower  at 4200 rpm
Torque  at 2600 rpm
Compression ratio 8.5:1

Output for 1982-83 models (net):
Horsepower  at 4000 rpm
Torque  at 1800 rpm
Compression ratio 8.5:1

Engine dimensions:
Intake valve diameter 
Exhaust valve diameter 
Connecting rod length 
Deck height 
Bore 
Stroke 

VAM Javelin (1971–1973) U.S. equivalent - AMC Javelin
VAM Classic DPL (1972–1976) U.S. equivalent - AMC Matador Sedan
VAM Classic Brougham (1972, 1974–1976) U.S. equivalent - 1972 AMC Matador hardtop and AMC Matador Brougham coupe
VAM Classic AMX (1974–1976) U.S. equivalent - AMC Matador X coupe
VAM Pacer (1976–1979) U.S. equivalent - AMC Pacer coupe
VAM Pacer X (1979) U.S. equivalent - AMC Pacer X coupe
VAM American Rally (1976–1977) U.S. equivalent - AMC Hornet X sedan instead of hatchback
VAM American Rally AMX (1978–1979) U.S. equivalent - AMC Concord AMX hatchback
VAM American GFS (1977–1982) U.S. equivalent - AMC Hornet DL two-door sedan plus AMC Concord DL and Limited two-door sedans
VAM Camioneta American Automática (1977–1978) U.S. equivalent - AMC Hornet DL wagon and AMC Concord DL wagon, both with automatic transmission
VAM Camioneta American DL (1979–1983) U.S. equivalent - AMC Concord DL and Limited wagons
VAM American 06/S (1979) U.S. equivalent AMC Concord two-door sedan, high-performance limited edition
VAM American ECD (1980–1982) U.S. equivalent - AMC Concord DL and Limited four-door sedans
VAM Rally AMX (1980–1983) U.S. equivalent - AMC Spirit GT coupe, standard version
VAM Rally GT (1980–1981) U.S. equivalent - AMC Spirit GT coupe, high-performance version
VAM Rally SST (1981) U.S. equivalent - AMC Spirit Limited coupe
VAM Lerma (1981–1982)
VAM Jeep Wagoneer (1972–1983) U.S. equivalent - AMC Jeep Wagoneer
Renault/VAM Jeep Grand Wagoneer from 1984 through 1986 (U.S. equivalent - Jeep Grand Wagoneer)

4.0 

The  engine was developed by AMC in just 26 months using many off the shelf components while featuring, among others, additional strength, improved combustion chamber, port setup, and cam profile. For example, the cast aluminum valve cover featured 15 bolts, the industry's most, to achieve a positive seal.

The new engine, which was introduced in 1986 for the 1987 model year, was a further evolution of AMC's 258 six. Connecting rod length was 6.125" - similar to the discontinued 199 which was phased out in 1970.

The 4.0 is one of AMC's best-known engines. It was one of four AMC engines kept in production when Chrysler bought AMC in 1987. Chrysler engineers continued to refine the engine to reduce noise, vibration, and harshness. The last in the line of the AMC inline sixes, the 4.0 is regarded as one of the best Chrysler 4x4 off-road engines. A Motor Trend long-term test of a 1997 Cherokee XJ noted "this long-lived OHV powerplant has a reputation for getting people where they need to go" as well as "much love expressed by owners for the torquey 4.0-liter/190-horsepower inline six." The engine is known for longevity, and can sometimes go more than  without rebuilding. Also, the vibration dampener (harmonic balancer) usually gives out after 300,000 miles where it is common for the rubber insulation to deteriorate where a service replacement is warranted. Described "as reliable as a block of wood" by Popular Mechanics and ranked first among "the ten best car engines they stopped making in the past 20 years," the 4.0 L should run 200,000 miles before a rebuild is even expected and it is also able to "suffer running conditions that'd kill most motors."

When introduced, the block-mounted oil filter check valve was eliminated on the 4.0 (along with the 2.5 and 4.2s manufactured after September 1986) when AMC engineers standardized their oil filters. The pre-1987 engines had an oil filter adapter with 3/4 (cylinder block end) and 13/16 threads (which used a GM oil filter common to Buick, Oldsmobile, Pontiac, and Cadillac V8 engines) while the 1987-06 engines were originally fitted with a  metric thread filter (later revised in 1991 for the common 3/4 threaded Mopar and Ford V8 oil filter; the oil filter adapter was redesigned where the oil filter is positioned 90 degrees offset adjacent to the starter motor - a Ford V8 oil filter can be used in place of the short filter increasing oiling capacity).

The first 4.0L engines in 1987 had a Renix (Renault/Bendix) engine management system considered quite advanced for their time. A knock sensor allowed the ECU to control spark advance in response to fuel octane and engine load. Unfortunately, there are few scan tools capable of interfacing with the system to pull diagnostics codes. RENIX systems also have no permanent memory for diagnostics codes thus making the diagnosis of intermittent problems more difficult.

Chrysler also enlarged the throttle body and redesigned the intake and exhaust manifolds for more efficiency, and the fuel injectors were replaced with higher flow units. The camshaft timing was also changed. Badging on most Jeeps equipped with this engine read "4.0 Litre HIGH OUTPUT." The new cam profile combined with altered computer programming eliminated the need for an EGR valve and knock sensor, but made the engine more sensitive to alterations, especially where emissions are concerned. The OEM fuel injectors used with the Mopar MPI system (manufactured by Siemens) have been known to leak fuel especially with OBDII where plugged catalytic converters are common which usually throws a P0420 code.

Small changes were made to the cylinder head for the 1995 model year. In 1996, the engine block was redesigned for greater strength. The new block had more webbing and a stud girdle for added rigidity of the crankshaft main bearings. Engines installed in 1999 Grand Cherokees carried the "PowerTech" name that had been used intermittently in prior years and on other Chrysler truck and SUV engines. The name was subsequently passed on to 4.0s in the other Jeep models that used the engine, the Cherokee and Wrangler. The cylinder head was again changed for the 2000 model year to a more emissions-friendly design. This head was designated as "0331" in the casting number. Early 0331 heads are prone to cracking, causing coolant to contaminate the oil, which can lead to catastrophic engine failure. The head cracks in the center between #3 and #4 cylinders. The crack is usually discernible with the valve cover removed as a "milky" tan line. This condition is usually discovered before a catastrophic engine failure, but can lead there if not corrected in a timely manner. The casting was fixed in mid to late 2001, but the same casting number was retained. The "fixed" heads have "TUPY" cast in the center where the cracks used to occur. Also new for the 2000 model year, was the distributorless, coil on plug ignition system. Option code: ERH.

Output:

The 4.0 engine was discontinued at the end of the 2006 model year, replaced in the redesigned 2007 JK Jeep Wrangler by Chrysler's 3.8 L OHV V6, which originated in the company's minivans.

This engine was used in the following vehicles:
1987–2001 Jeep Cherokee
1993–2004 Jeep Grand Cherokee
1987–1990 Jeep Wagoneer
1987–1992 Jeep Comanche
1991–2006 Jeep Wrangler

Connecting rod lengths
1964–1970:
 - 
 - 
 - 

1971–2006:
 - 
 - 
 - 
 - 

Only two deck heights. Short should be . Tall is from a 74-76 AMC factory service manuals, prior to 1974 deck height was not printed. Deck height changed slightly over the years 1977–1982 service manuals state , the 1993 Jeep factory manual states . Deck heights may have changed to accommodate slightly different compression ratios over the years.

The 1971 and older blocks use a "small" bell housing bolt pattern that is exclusive to AMC and small Nash sixes. In 1972 the bell housing bolt pattern was changed to match the AMC V8's - its final use was in 2006 when the 4.0 was phased out. Four bolts on the cylinder block are matched to the transmission bellhousing where an adapter plate serves both as a dust cover - two additional bolt holes on the transmission bellhousing used on the AMC V8 are used to secure the dust cover. The 1971 model year 258 uses the "small" pattern, the only version of the 258 to do so.

See also
AMC straight-4 engine
AMC V8 engine
AMC Engines
AMC and Jeep transmissions
List of Chrysler engines

References

Adapting a 4.0 HO head to an older AMC block

External links

AMC Rambler Club — club for 1958 - 1969 AMCs
American Motors Owners — club for 1958 - 1987 AMCs

AMC engines
Chrysler engines
Straight-six engines
Jeep engines
Products introduced in 1952
Products introduced in 1964